Christopher Michael Reitsma (born December 31, 1977) is a Canadian American former right-handed professional baseball pitcher. He played seven seasons in Major League Baseball (MLB), from  until , with the Cincinnati Reds, Atlanta Braves, and Seattle Mariners.

Professional career

Red Sox and Reds
Reitsma, drafted in the first round of the 1996 MLB draft by the Boston Red Sox (34th overall), made his MLB debut in 2001 for the Cincinnati Reds. After spending three seasons with the Reds as both a starter and reliever, the Atlanta Braves traded for him on March 26, 2004 to bolster their bullpen.

Atlanta Braves
Reitsma was used as a setup man for Atlanta's closer John Smoltz in 2004. He appeared in 84 games and did a serviceable job, however he was shelled in Game 5 of the 2004 National League Division Series against the Houston Astros, allowing the game to be broken open, and essentially ending the Braves' season.

In , with newly acquired closer Danny Kolb getting off to a rough start, the Braves elected to use Reitsma as the closer rather than returning John Smoltz to that role. Reitsma did relatively well, earning 15 saves, but on the last day of non-waiver trades, the Braves traded for relief pitcher Kyle Farnsworth from the Detroit Tigers. Farnsworth soon replaced Reitsma as the closer, sending Reitsma back to being a setup man.

With the Braves unable to retain Farnsworth, who signed with the New York Yankees following the 2005 season, the team feverishly searched to fill the closer's role through free agency or a trade. However, he proved to be ineffective in the job throughout his abbreviated season.

On July 3, 2006, Reitsma was placed on the disabled list with ulnar neuritis in his right arm. He spent the rest of the season on the disabled list. Bob Wickman was brought in to replace Reitsma near the trade deadline, and after performing well, Wickman was signed to a contract in the offseason by the Braves.

Seattle Mariners
Reitsma was non-tendered by the Braves on December 12, 2006. Reitmsa's 2007 season was marred by injuries, making his last appearance on July 29. He was placed on the 15-day disabled list on July 30 and was transferred to the 60-day disabled list on September 4, ending his season. After the season, his club option was not picked up and Reitsma became a free agent. On January 10, 2008, he re-signed with the Mariners to a minor league contract with an invitation to spring training. However, he never pitched with the Mariners in 2008, and has not played professionally since.

International career
Reitsma was selected Canada national baseball team at the 2006 World Baseball Classic and 2008 Beijing Olympic Games.

Pitching style
Reitsma featured three pitches, a sinking fastball which sometimes would induce groundballs, as well a changeup. He also possessed a big, looping curveball which he did not throw as much as his fastball and changeup. Atlanta Braves coaches attempted to have Reitsma focus on only two pitches in an attempt to simplify his delivery.

Personal life
He is married to Janelle and has three daughters, Kylie, Emily and Allyson. He graduated from Calgary Christian High School in Calgary, Alberta, Canada, with three varsity letters in basketball. He is also a dual citizen of both Canada and the United States. He is a born-again Christian.

The Grim Reitsma
Reitsma's team nickname on the Mariners was "The Grim Reitsma". Reitsma himself was apparently the last to know his bullpen brethren had taken to wearing T-shirts with his name on them. The relievers began wearing gray shirts with the words "The Grim Reitsma" on them, complete with a maple leaf logo — Reitsma is Canadian — and the picture of a Grim Reaper.

Seattle reliever George Sherrill and strength coach Allen Wirtala had the shirts made up shortly after a game at Yankee Stadium. Reitsma had gotten up in the bullpen when a fan stood up in the stands and shouted, "Grim Reitsma!" Reitsma went on the disabled list shortly after. "I didn't even know about the shirts until I got back", he said. "I saw everybody wearing them."

Philanthropy
Reitsma also performs generous charity work in the off season with the mentally and physically handicapped.

On June 20, 2008, Reitsma was named as spokesman for the Parkinson's Society of Southern Alberta's SuperWalk fundraiser. Reitsma's father Mike, former senior pastor of River Park Church in Calgary, was diagnosed with Parkinson's in 1985.

Chris is the founder of Reitsma's Relievers, whose mission is to benefit at-risk children, youth and their families by providing assistance, programs and events designed to build self-esteem, provide unique life changing opportunities and help them to set and achieve their life goals.

References

External links

1977 births
Living people
Atlanta Braves players
American people of Dutch descent
American emigrants to Canada
Baseball people from Alberta
Baseball players at the 2008 Summer Olympics
Baseball players from Minneapolis
Canadian evangelicals
Canadian people of Dutch descent
Cincinnati Reds players
Gulf Coast Red Sox players
Louisville Bats players
Major League Baseball pitchers
Major League Baseball players from Canada
Michigan Battle Cats players
Olympic baseball players of Canada
Sarasota Red Sox players
Sportspeople from Calgary
Seattle Mariners players
Tacoma Rainiers players
Trenton Thunder players
World Baseball Classic players of Canada
2006 World Baseball Classic players